Combrit is a commune in the Finistère department of Brittany in north-western France.

Artists such as Lucien Simon and Alfred Marzin painted many pictures of the area.

Population
Inhabitants of Combrit are called in French Combritois.

Breton language
The municipality launched a linguistic plan concerning the Breton language through Ya d'ar brezhoneg on May 29, 2008.

Sights
Parc botanique de Cornouaille

See also
Communes of the Finistère department

References

External links

Official website 

Mayors of Finistère Association 

Communes of Finistère